The Overcoat is a 1926 Soviet drama film directed by Grigori Kozintsev and Leonid Trauberg, based on the Nikolai Gogol stories "Nevsky Prospekt" and "The Overcoat".

Charlie Chaplin was invited to play the lead role, but as an alien resident in the United States, was threatened by US government officials with being refused entry back into the country if he made the film and it contained Soviet propaganda.

Plot
Arriving in St. Petersburg, landowner Ptitsin (Nikolai Gorodnichev) tries to achieve with the help of bribes a favorable decision of his litigation concerning a neighbor. With swindler and blackmailer Yaryzhka (Sergei Gerasimov) he finds a functionary who is willing to take the money. Cautious Bashmachkin (Andrei Kostrichkin) to whom the briber comes, does not want to take on the dangerous enterprise, although he can not resist the charms of a beautiful female stranger (Antonina Eremeeva) whom he met on the Nevsky Prospekt. Later Akaky Akakievich finds out that the woman of his dreams is only an accomplice to swindlers. Fearing punishment, the frightened bureaucrat becomes even more reclusive, all the more carefully isolating himself off from people.

Years later, the already aged and decrepit titular counselor Bashmachkin is forced at the cost of enormous efforts, down to saving the last penny to order a new custom overcoat from tailor Petrovich (Vladimir Lepko). It represents for him so much that it is impossible for him not to fall in love with the tailor's creation. The old campaigner literally becomes rejuvenated when he tries on the new clothing with a warm fur collar. Fellow officers have arranged a little party in honor of the colleague, but that night poor Bashmachkin is robbed on his way home from the festivities. He tries to complain and goes with his trouble to the authorities. Nobody wants to listen to him and he is kicked out, and some time later heartbroken Akakiy dies peacefully, a senseless death ending a meaningless life.

Cast
 Andrei Kostrichkin as Akakiy Akakievich Baschmachkin
 Antonina Eremeeva as girl, "heavenly creation"
 Aleksei Kapler as "insignificant man" / "significant man"
 Emil Gal as tailor
 Sergei Gerasimov as Yaryzhka, swindler-blackmailer
 Oleg Zhakov as Baschmachkin's colleague
 Yanina Zhejmo as tailor's assistant
 Vladimir Lepko as tailor Petrovich
 Pavel Berezin as functionary
 Tatiana Ventzel as barber
 Pyotr Sobolevsky as functionary
 Ksenia Denisova as Agrafena
 Nikolai Gorodnichev as Pyotr Petrovich Ptitsin
 Boris Shpis

References

External links
 

1926 films
Lenfilm films
Soviet black-and-white films
Soviet silent feature films
Films directed by Grigori Kozintsev
Films based on The Overcoat
Films directed by Leonid Trauberg
Soviet drama films
1926 drama films
Silent drama films
1920s Russian-language films